The Great Subscription Purses were a series of flat horse races in Great Britain run at York Racecourse, usually over a distance of 4 miles, that took place each year in August from 1751 to 1833. During the second half of the 18th century they were amongst the most important races in the county, but during the 19th century their importance declined as racing became more focused on shorter distances.

History
The races first commenced in 1751, with a four-mile race for five-year-olds, each carrying 10 stone, run on the Wednesday of York's August meeting. On the Friday of the meeting a race was run for four-year-olds, each carrying 9 stone. The four-year-old's race was run in two-mile heats.

The format was changed in 1759, with a race for horses aged six and over being added on the Thursday. From 1759 onwards all three races were run over four miles in a single heat.

The conditions of the races were changed in 1818. A race for five-year-olds and older was run on the Tuesday. In the race five-year-olds carried 8 st 7 lb, six-year-olds carried 8 st 12 lb and seven-year-olds and older carried 9 st. A race for four-year-olds was run on Wednesday. In this race colts carried 8 st 7 lb and fillies carried 8 st 4 lb. The final race was for four-year-olds and five-year-olds and was run on Thursday. Four-year-olds carried 8 st and five-year-olds carried 8 st 11 lb. All races were still run over four miles.

In 1826 the four-year-old race and the four- and five-year-old race were both shortened to two miles. In the four-year-old race the weights stayed the same and in the four- and five-year-old race four-year-olds carried 8 st 3 lb and five-year-olds 8 st 10 lb. The races were discontinued after the 1833 runnings.

Records
Most successful horse (5 wins):
 Catton – 1814 (5 yo & 6 yo+), 1815 (6 yo+), 1816 (6 yo+), 1825 (6 yo+)

Winners 1751–1817

Winners 1818–1833

See also
 Horseracing in Great Britain
 List of British flat horse races

References

 
 
 
 
 
 
 
 
 
 
 
 
 
 
 
 
 
 
 
 
 
 
 
 
 
 
 
 
 
 
 
 
 
 
 
 
 
 
 
 
 
 
 
 

Discontinued horse races
Flat races in Great Britain
Recurring sporting events established in 1751
York Racecourse
1833 disestablishments in the United Kingdom
1751 establishments in Great Britain